Robert José de León Sánchez, known by his stage name Papi Sánchez (born 18 September 1975 in Santo Domingo), is a Dominican merengue rapper and singer. In 2004, he had an international hit with the song "Enamórame", which reached the top ten in francophone countries. The next year, he released a cover of Nelly's song, "Dilemma".

Discography

Albums

Singles

*Did not appear in the official Belgian Ultratop 50 (Wallonia) charts, but rather in the bubbling under Ultratip charts reaching number 1. Fifty positions added to actual Ultratip position to arrive to a comparable Ultratop position.

Featured in 

*Did not appear in the official Belgian Ultratop 50 (Wallonia) charts, but rather in the bubbling under Ultratip charts. Fifty positions added to actual Ultratip position to arrive to a comparable Ultratop position.

References

1975 births
Living people
People from Santo Domingo
Dominican Republic rappers
21st-century Dominican Republic male singers
Merengue musicians